Dominique Van Wieringen (born June 22, 1995) is a Canadian professional stock car racing driver. She last competed part-time in the ARCA Menards Series, driving the No. 30 Ford for Rette Jones Racing.

Racing career

Early career
Van Wieringen began racing motocross at the age of five and eventually moved to kart racing. In 2011, she made the transition to full-sized race cars and scored a feature win at Spartan Speedway in Mason, MI. The following season, she won the Outlaw Super Late Model Championship at Springport Motor Speedway. Moving to the JEGS/CRA All-Star Series in 2013, Van Wieringen became the first female to win on the All-Stars Tour on September 22, 2013, at Lucas Oil Raceway.

Van Wieringen signed with NEMCO Motorsports for the 2015 season, running super late models in various CRA Super Series and CARS-Tour events, occasionally as a teammate to John Hunter Nemechek. After modest success, including leading several races and earning a few top-5s, along with some frustrations, Van Wieringen signed with Mark Rette to drive full-time in the K&N Pro Series East for 2016.

K&N Pro Series East
After signing on with RJR, she would have a less than desirable rookie season, despite qualifying on one of the front two rows for six out of the first eight races and leading at Mobile and Stafford Motor Speedway, Van Wieringen only mustered a best finish of tenth through the first eleven races, however she would go on a hot streak in the final 3 races reeling off three consecutive top 5 finishes to round out the year. She was awarded an honorable mention in the "Breakout Driver" category for her rookie campaign.

In 2017, she returned to Rette Jones Racing for one K&N Pro Series East race, finishing third at Langley Speedway.

Camping World Truck Series
Following the conclusion of the 2016 NASCAR K&N Pro Series East season, Van Wieringen made her debut in the NASCAR Camping World Truck Series at Phoenix International Raceway for Young's Motorsports in a partnership with Rette Jones, who provided the truck for that race. While running 15th on lap 26, she was shoved into turn 1 by Austin Wayne Self which would force her into Tommy Joe Martins and end her night early, she would finish 31st.

ARCA Menards Series
Van Wieringen participated in ARCA's Daytona testing in January 2020, and posted the fastest time in one of the sessions. She drove the No. 30 for her former team, Rette Jones Racing. RJR later signed her back to run the race at the track in February of that year. In the race, she was involved in the big one and finished 25th.

2018/2020
2018, Van Wieringen would make a return to racing while being an intern engineer for Joe Gibbs Racing in Modified’s at Corrigan Oil Speedway where she would score the pole and lead every lap up until a left front tire blew taking her out for the rest of the night.

In 2019, she would run the full schedule at Springport Motor Speedway, and the Corrigan Oil (Spartan) Speedway, driving for Jon McNett in the number 7 Duatech Automotive Modified, winning the championship at Springport.

Personal life
Van Wieringen is a Mechanical engineering student at the University of North Carolina at Charlotte. Her younger brother, Tristan, is also a race car driver, and he also drives for the Rette Jones team, running part-time in the ARCA Menards Series East for 2020. Her dad, Murray, owns DuroByte Motorsports, a Super Late Model Driver development program, which currently fields the No. 5 Ford Fusion for Michael Clancy.

Motorsports career results

NASCAR
(key) (Bold – Pole position awarded by qualifying time. Italics – Pole position earned by points standings or practice time. * – Most laps led.)

Camping World Truck Series

K&N Pro Series East

ARCA Menards Series
(key) (Bold – Pole position awarded by qualifying time. Italics – Pole position earned by points standings or practice time. * – Most laps led.)

 Season still in progress
 Ineligible for series points

References

External links
 
 

1995 births
Living people
NASCAR drivers
Canadian female racing drivers
People from Amherstburg, Ontario